The 2019 Belgian Super Cup was a football match that took place on 20 July 2019 between Genk, the winners of the 2018–19 Belgian First Division A, and Mechelen, the winners of the 2018–19 Belgian Cup. In its eighth appearance, Genk won its second Belgian Super Cup after already winning the 2011 edition, by a convincing 3–0 margin. Defender Sébastien Dewaest was twice able to score from a set piece delivery, with Dante Vanzeir scoring the final goal in the closing minutes. Mechelen could have become only the ninth different club to win the Belgian Super Cup, but failed to win again after an earlier loss in the 1987 Belgian Super Cup. With the victory of Genk, the Belgian Super Cup was won for the 15th consecutive year by the league winners, as the 2004 Belgian Super Cup still marked the last year the cup winners overcame the league winners, when Club Brugge beat Anderlecht.

Match

Details

See also
2018–19 Belgian First Division A
2018–19 Belgian Cup

References

2019
K.R.C. Genk matches
K.V. Mechelen matches
Supercup
Belgian Super Cup